Wyszanów  (German: Schwusen) is a village in the administrative district of Gmina Szlichtyngowa, within Wschowa County, Lubusz Voivodeship, in western Poland.

References

Villages in Wschowa County